The 2016 AFF Championship qualification tournament was the qualification process for the 2016 AFF Championship, the eleventh edition of the AFF Championship. It was held in Cambodia and involved either teams that finished last in the group stage of 2014 AFF Championship or lower ranked teams in Southeast Asia. The format was a single round-robin tournament with the top team qualifying for the tournament proper.

The matches were originally scheduled to be held between the dates of 13 to 22 October, before being announced as shifting forward slightly to the 15 and 21 October 2016 on the day Yanmar and Suzuki confirmed their sponsorship.

Venues

Results
 Times listed are local (UTC+7:00)

Goalscorers
4 goals

  Phatthana Syvilay

3 goals

  Prak Mony Udom

2 goals

  Adi Said
  Chan Vathanaka
  Soukaphone Vongchiengkham

1 goal

  Faiq Bolkiah
  Shafie Effendy
  Razimie Ramlli
  Chhin Chhoeun
  Keo Sokpheng
  Tith Dina
  Moukda Souksavath
  Anggisu Barbosa
  Rufino Gama
  Ricardo Maia
  Nelson Viegas

References

2016 in AFF football
2016 AFF Championship
International association football competitions hosted by Cambodia
2016 in Cambodian football